Saryagash (Saryağaş) is a town and the administrative center of Saryagash District in Turkistan Region of central Kazakhstan. Population:

References

Populated places in Turkistan Region